The 1961–62 season was the 14th season of competitive football in Israel and the 36th season under the Israeli Football Association, established in 1928, during the British Mandate.

Review and Events
 The national team completed their involvement in the 1962 World Cup qualification, playing Italy during October 1961. The team stunned Italy in the first match by taking a 2–0 lead in the first half of the first match, played at Ramat Gan Stadium, only to concede 4 goals in the second half, and then losing 0–6 in the second leg.
 At the end of the season, Liga Alef was expanded from 14 clubs to 16 clubs, as 2 clubs relegated from the league at the end of the season and the 4 winners of Liga Bet promoted to Liga Alef. This also meant that at the end of the season the 8 relegated teams from Liga Bet were replaced by 10 promoted clubs from Liga Gimel.

Domestic leagues

Promotion and relegation
The following promotions and relegations took place at the end of the season:

Promoted to Liga Leumit
 Hakoah Tel Aviv1

Promoted to Liga Alef
 Hapoel Safed
 Hapoel Hadera
 Hapoel Lod
 Hapoel Holon

Promoted to Liga Bet
 Beitar Kiryat Shmona
 Beitar Binyamina
 Hapoel Bnei Nazareth
 Hapoel Dora Netanya
 Beitar Kiryat Ono
 Hapoel Givatayim
 ASA Jerusalem
 Beitar Harari Tel Aviv
 Hapoel Ofakim
 Hapoel Kiryat Gat

Relegated from Liga Leumit
 Maccabi Netanya

Relegated from Liga Alef
 Maccabi Hadera
 Hapoel Rehovot

Relegated from Liga Bet
 Hapoel Tel Hanan
 Hapoel Beit HaShita
 Hapoel Pardesiya
 HaCarmel Club Haifa
 Maccabi Jerusalem
 Hapoel Ein Karem
 Hapoel Bnei Zion
 Beitar Jaffa

1. Hakoah Tel Aviv merged with Maccabi Ramat Gan to form Hakoah Maccabi Ramat Gan. The merged club took Hakoah Tel Aviv's place in Liga Leumit.

Domestic cups

Israel State Cup
The 1961–62 Israel State Cup started on 12 February 1961, during the previous season, and was carried over the summer break and finished with the replayed final on 7 May 1962, in which Maccabi Haifa defeated Maccabi Tel Aviv 5–2.

On 24 March 1962, the next season's competition began, and was carried over to the next season.

National Teams

National team

1962 World Cup qualification (UEFA Group 7, final round)

1961–62 matches

References

 
Seasons in Israeli football